Isfjorden is a village in Rauma Municipality in Møre og Romsdal county, Norway. The mountains Kyrkjetaket and Gjuratinden lie a few kilometers away. The historic Hen Church is located in the village.

History
Isfjorden played an important role in the Battle of Kringen, when Scottish ships, needing a landing spot after sea routes had been blocked by Danish forces, landed there on 20 August 1612.

Clothing industry
Historically there was a lot of trade between Isfjorden and the northern county of Nordland. Shoes and clothing were produced in practically every home, and eventually several factories were established. This earned Isfjorden the label "the cradle of the Norwegian clothing industry". One of the factories, "Oddfred Tokles konfeksjonsfabrikk", has been turned into a museum.

Media gallery

References

External links

Isfjorden in Romsdal 
Webcamera with pictures from Isfjorden

Villages in Møre og Romsdal
Rauma, Norway